Oizuru is one of the sacred garments of the traditional dress of Japanese pilgrims.

Relevance and use 
Oizuru is the one of essentials of the Pilgrims. It is a simple outer garment. The shape of the garment is similar to a white coat or a jacket. There are three breadths of material are used in it that signify the Buddhist deities (Amida, Kwannon, and Seishi). The garment is stamped with a seal pilgrims visit. It is then preserved with utmost care. They clad the owner in the same at the time of burial.

See also 

 Shikoku Pilgrimage is a multi-site pilgrimage of 88 temples associated with the Buddhist monk Kūkai (Kōbō Daishi) on the island of Shikoku, Japan. 

 List of National Treasures of Japan (sculptures)
 Buddhism in Japan

References 

Costumes
Japanese pilgrimages